Milan Mirić is a Bosnian footballer who plays as a defender for the Loyola University Maryland men's soccer team.

Club career

FK Zlatibor Čajetina
In mid-January 2019, Mirić joined FK Zlatibor Čajetina.

Personal life
They were born to Velibor and Slavica, has two sisters, Ana and Sonja.

References

External links
Loyola Greyhounds profile
Dayton Flyers profile
USL League Two profile

1999 births
Living people
People from Bijeljina
Association football central defenders
Bosnia and Herzegovina footballers
Bosnia and Herzegovina youth international footballers
FK Sloboda Užice players
FK Zlatibor Čajetina players
FK Borac Čačak players
Dayton Flyers men's soccer players
Serbian First League players
Bosnia and Herzegovina expatriate footballers
Expatriate footballers in Serbia
Bosnia and Herzegovina expatriate sportspeople in Serbia
Expatriate soccer players in the United States
Bosnia and Herzegovina expatriate sportspeople in the United States
Loyola Greyhounds men's soccer players
USL League Two players